The Single Tax Party started as the Land Value Tax Party in 1910 and was renamed the Commonwealth Land Party for the presidential campaign of 1924.  Its single-issue platform was based on the free-market tax reform principles defined and popularized by American political economist and public intellectual Henry George, the ideology now called Georgism, which proposed a single tax based on the value of land.

Presidential tickets
 1920
President - Robert C. Macauley
Vice-president - Carrie Chapman Catt
 1924
President - William J. Wallace
Vice-president - John C. Lincoln

See also
 Geolibertarianism
 Georgism
 Land value tax (in the 1920s better known as the "single tax")
 Tax reform
 Tax shift
 Third party (United States)

References

External links
1924 Commonwealth Land Party platform

1924 establishments in the United States
Georgist parties
Political parties established in 1924
Political parties in the United States
Progressive Era in the United States
Tax reform in the United States